Mohar Singh Rathore  (5 January 1926 – 22 June 1985) was a social reformer & political Congress worker. He was a follower of Arya Samaji and Acharya Vinoba Bhave's Bhoodan movement (land donation movement).  He advocated for social reforms such as discouraging purdah, dowry, child marriage & Un-touchability. He became Member of the Rajasthan Legislative Assembly in 1962 for the first time & remained in active Politics all his life. He contested election for the Legislative Assembly again in 1967 but lost to Sh. Meghraj Mali of BKD but in the subsequent election of 1972 he became M.L.A. again. Again he lost Assembly election in 1977 but never look back. Elections lost and won but his ideology was that the service of the people and the development of the area must go on. He was always instrumental in the overall development of Churu area. founded the girls college at Churu under a public trust CHURU BALIKA MAHAVIDYALAYA. He contested Assemble election from Sardarshahar in 1980 but lost by a small margin of 132 votes but kept on his political work, soon in 1984 he contested the election of the Lok Sabha on the Congress ticket and got elected by a record margin of one lac and eleven thousand votes. He died as a sitting Member of the Parliament of India.

Early life

He was born in the village of Lakhau, 15 km east of Churu (चूरु) in a Rajput family. His father Thakur Moti Singh Rathore died while Mohar Singh Rathore was at university. His mother was Bhur Kanwar daughter of Thakur Shivbux singh of Morwa near Pilani.

Education 

He was taught by his grandfather Thakur Mohabat Singh Ji and his mother, then by Seduram Ji from 1929 to 1933. From 1933 to 1935 he went Alsisar, 25 km away, at J K High School. In 1935 he joined Birla High School, Pilani, then the following year he was sent with his elder brother to Walter Noble High School, Bikaner until 1942. He passed the High School Examination with First Division. He passed Inter Science with First Division from Birla Engineering College, Pilani. He passed BA (Hons) as a non-collegiate student and then L.L.B. from Jaipur.

Positions held 
 1956 – Enrolled Advocate, Rajasthan High Court
 1962 – Elected MLA Rajasthan from Churu
 1965 – Elected Member, Rajasthan PCC
 1970 – Elected Member, AICC
 1971 – Elected MLA Rajasthan from Churu
 1972 – Elected Vice-President, DCC Churu
 Elected Director, Churu Central Co-operative Bank
 Elected chairman, Churu Central Co-operative Bank
 Elected Director, Rajasthan Apex Bank, Jaipur
 Elected chairman, Wholesale Upbhokta Bhandar, Churu
 Elected Director, URMUL, Bikaner
 Elected President, Sarvhitkarini Sabha, Churu
 Founded Balika MahaVidyalaya, Churu as Founder chairman (A Girls PG College)
 1984 – Elected to Lok Sabha from Churu for the Congress Party

Personal life 

He was married to Pan Kanwar Bhati from Randhawa village, Sirsa, Haryana and had seven children, five sons namely Jai Singh Rathore, Devi Singh Rathore, Narender Singh Rathore, Prithvi Singh Rathore and Vimal Singh Rathore and two daughters, Sumitra and Saroj Kanwar.

In popular culture 
Veli: An epic poetry written in Dingal dialect and Nagri script by writer—Mukun Singh.

References

Rajasthani politicians
1926 births
Rajasthani people
Mohar Singh Rathore
1985 deaths
People from Churu district
India MPs 1984–1989
Lok Sabha members from Rajasthan